Gudigunta is a village in Eluru district of the Indian state of Andhra Pradesh. It is located in Denduluru mandal of Eluru revenue division. The nearest railway station is Ontimitta (VNM) located at a distance of 39.21 km.

Demographics 
At the 2011 Census of India, Gudigunta had a population of 2,988 (1,499 males and 1,489 females with a sex ratio of 993 females per 1000 males). 170 children were in the age group of 0–6 years, with a child sex ratio of 1,152 girls per 1,000 boys. The average literacy rate stood at 79.95% with 2253 literates.

References

Villages in Eluru district